Helen Blaby is a radio host and reporter with the BBC and a newspaper columnist.

Early life and education 
Part of Blaby's childhood was spent in Cornwall, where she attended Redruth School. She graduated in 1996 with a bachelor of arts in time-based media and radio from the University of the West of England.

Career 

Her years as a broadcaster, according to CHBN Radio, have made her a household name. Beginning in 2004, Blaby was the breakfast traffic reporter for BBC Five Live, including reporting live from her home during a 2005 storm. In January 2010, she began reporting during the drivetime slot. Since then, she has been a presenter on BBC Northampton, hosting from noon to 3pm on a magazine show Monday-Friday. She has also worked as a cover presenter for BBC Radio Cambridgeshire.

Blaby's travel reporting was referred to in a British Journalism Review article by media executive and broadcaster Matthew Bannister. The BBC sent her out on the road again, but this time with a team of health professionals at venues throughout Northamptonshire county. She met listeners and encouraged residents to get full health checks.

In 2006, she was one of several women in the news business interviewed by The Independent on what it's like being single and in the media.

Blaby, who lives in Northamptonshire, is also a columnist for her local newspaper, Northampton Chronicle & Echo.

References

External links

Norhampton Chronicle & Echo, "Radio star Helen Blaby to help host Chron’s Kitchen contest," 1 June 2011

Living people
Year of birth missing (living people)
BBC newsreaders and journalists
British radio personalities
British radio presenters
British motoring journalists
People from Northamptonshire
British talk radio presenters
People from Cornwall
British women television journalists
British women radio presenters